Hajdúszoboszló is a district in western part of Hajdú-Bihar County. Hajdúszoboszló is also the name of the town where the district seat is found. The district is located in the Northern Great Plain Statistical Region. This district is a part of Hajdúság historical and geographical region.

Geography 
Hajdúszoboszló District borders with Balmazújváros District to the north, Debrecen District and Derecske District to the east, Püspökladány District to the south, Karcag District (Jász-Nagykun-Szolnok County) to the west. The number of the inhabited places in Hajdúszoboszló District is 5.

Municipalities 
The district has 2 towns and 3 villages.
(ordered by population, as of 1 January 2012)

The bolded municipalities are cities.

Demographics

In 2011, it had a population of 43,061 and the population density was 55/km².

Ethnicity
Besides the Hungarian majority, the main minorities are the Roma (approx. 650) and German (300) and Romanian (100).

Total population (2011 census): 43,061
Ethnic groups (2011 census): Identified themselves: 38,155 persons:
Hungarians: 36,770 (96.37%)
Gypsies: 618 (1.62%)
Others and indefinable: 767 (2.01%)
Approx. 5,000 persons in Hajdúszoboszló District did not declare their ethnic group at the 2011 census.

Religion
Religious adherence in the county according to 2011 census:

Reformed – 11,291;
Catholic – 3,124 (Roman Catholic – 2,607; Greek Catholic – 517);
Evangelical – 51;
other religions – 439; 
Non-religious – 17,235; 
Atheism – 388;
Undeclared – 10,533.

Gallery

See also
List of cities and towns of Hungary

References

External links
 Postal codes of the Hajdúszoboszló District

Districts in Hajdú-Bihar County